Lucy Katherine Mangan (born 1974) is a British journalist and author. She is a columnist, features writer and TV critic for The Guardian. A major part of her writing is related to feminism.

Biography
Mangan grew up in Catford, southeast London, to parents originally from Lancashire. Her father worked in theatre, and her mother was a doctor. She read English at Trinity Hall, Cambridge, qualified as a solicitor, but worked in a bookshop until she found a work experience placement at The Guardian in 2003.

Mangan writes a regular column, TV reviews and occasional features at The Guardian.  Her book My Family and other Disasters (2009) is a collection of her newspaper columns. She has also written books about her childhood and her wedding. Her debut novel, Are We Having Fun Yet?, was published in 2021. The Scotsman's Kirsty McLuckie gave the novel a glowing review, describing the book as "a work of genius".

Mangan also has a regular column for Stylist magazine and has been a judge for the BookTrust Roald Dahl Funny Prize.

Mangan and her husband have one son.

Works
 My Family and other Disasters, Hachette (2010) 
 The Reluctant Bride: One Woman's Journey (Kicking and Screaming) Down the Aisle, Guardian Books (2012) 
 Hopscotch & Handbags: The Truth about Being a Girl, Headline (2013) 
 Inside Charlie's Chocolate Factory, Puffin UK/US (2014) 
 Bookworm: A Memoir of Childhood Reading, Square Peg (2018) 
 Are We Having Fun Yet?, Souvenir, (2021)

References

External links
 Guardian profile page
 Stylist column listing

1974 births
Living people
Alumni of Trinity Hall, Cambridge
People from Catford
English women non-fiction writers
English women journalists
English television critics
Politicians from London